
Year 146 (CXLVI) was a common year starting on Friday (link will display the full calendar) of the Julian calendar. At the time, it was known as the Year of the Consulship of Clarus and Severus (or, less frequently, year 899 Ab urbe condita). The denomination 146 for this year has been used since the early medieval period, when the Anno Domini calendar era became the prevalent method in Europe for naming years.

Events

By place

Roman Empire 
 Faustina the Younger is given the title Augusta, and becomes Roman Empress.
 Marcus Aurelius receives the imperium proconsular.

Asia 
 Change of era name from Yongxi (1st year) to Benchu era of the Chinese Han Dynasty.
 Han Huandi succeeds Han Zhidi as emperor of the Chinese Han Dynasty.
 Chadae becomes ruler of the Korean kingdom of Goguryeo.

Births 
 Guo Si (or Guo Duo), Chinese general (d. 197)

Deaths 
 Han Zhidi, Chinese emperor of the Han Dynasty (b. 138)
 Sextus Erucius Clarus, Roman politician

References